Daou may refer to:

People
Doris Daou (born 1964), Lebanese-born Canadian astronomer
Peter Daou (born 1965), an American political strategist
Vanessa Daou (born 1967), American singer, songwriter, poet, visual artist and dancer
Daou al-Salhine al-Jadak (died 2011), Libyan civil war commander

Other uses
Daou Technology Inc., a South Korean communication technology company
Stade Amari Daou, multi-use stadium in Ségou, Mali
The Daou, a New York-based dance music quintet

See also

Daouk (disambiguation)
Daw (disambiguation)
Dawe (disambiguation)

Arabic-language surnames